Pic-Pic was a Swiss automobile manufactured in Geneva from 1906 to 1924. They were produced by the Piccard-Pictet Company (whence its name derives) until 1920, and by Gnome et Rhône from 1920 until the demise of the marque in 1924.

History
In the early 1900s, two brothers, Charles and Frederic Dufaux set about building their own race car. The design called for a straight-8 12-litre engine with about 80 horsepower. To produce the automotive vehicle, the two brothers contacted the Piccard-Pictet Company, which had the capability to manufacture such a vehicle.

The elderly Paul Piccard did not think highly of the relatively new invention of the automotive vehicle. On the other hand, Lucien Pictet believed that cars had a bright future. This friction led to the founding of the Genevan Automotive Vehicle Society (G.A.V.S.) in 1905. This was a marketing company which contracted the Piccard-Pictet Company to manufacture automotive vehicles. In fact, the cars were known as S.A.G.s until 1910.

Lucien Pictet was appointed managing director. Léon Dufour was appointed chief designer and later added technical director to his job titles. Pictet travelled to Barcelona in early 1905, and while there met with fellow Swiss Marc Birkigt of Hispano-Suiza.  Pictet was so enamoured of the Hispano-Suizas that he negotiated a licence agreement in August 1905.

At the second annual International Geneva Motor Show in 1906, Piccard-Pictet/S.A.G. displayed a 20/24 horsepower licensed Hispano-Suiza. In 1907, a 6-cylinder 28/32 horsepower car was introduced. In 1910, a 14/16 horsepower 2.4-litre 4-cylinder car was added.

During World War I, the Swiss Army ordered a large number of Pic-Pics, which were known for their robustness. Indeed, these cars were in use until the late 1930s. The two post-war models used either a 2.9-litre 4-cylinder or a 5.9-litre V8. Sales of the cars declined after the war due to competition from imported brands. This led Piccard-Pictet Company to file for bankruptcy in 1920. Henceforth, Gnome et Rhône produced Pic-Pic cars, the last one being presented at the 1924 International Geneva Motor Show.

In 1916, Commandant Yves le Prieur used a Pic-Pic to demonstrate the safety and effectiveness of the Le Prieur rocket. The Pic-Pic's ability to travel up to 128 kilometres per hour simulated the velocity of the aircraft at the time. The successful test led to the use of LePrieur's rockets on Nieuport fighter aircraft against German balloon aircraft.

Motorsport
Pic-Pics competed in a number of motorsports within their short existence. Two Pic-Pics with 4.5-litre engines and front-wheel brakes competed in the 1914 Grand Prix, but both cars were withdrawn. In hillclimbing events, Pic-Pics competed more successfully. Pic-Pic cars came first in Vosges in 1909, in Bern in 1911, and in Jaunpass in 1912, 1913, and 1914.

Defunct motor vehicle manufacturers of Switzerland
Car manufacturers of Switzerland